The 1992 Mexican Grand Prix was a Formula One motor race held at Autódromo Hermanos Rodríguez in Mexico City on 22 March 1992. It was the second race of the 1992 Formula One World Championship.

The 69-lap race was won from pole position by British driver Nigel Mansell, driving a Williams-Renault. Italian teammate Riccardo Patrese finished second, with Michael Schumacher third in a Benetton-Ford, the first of an eventual 155 podiums for the German driver.

The Hermanos Rodríguez circuit had a reputation for being very bumpy, and by this point the bumps on the track had decayed even further, and the decline of Mexico City itself with increasing crowding and pollution problems made the event look bad for Formula One's glamorous image at the time. This was the final Formula One race in Mexico until 2015, when the Grand Prix was revived on a revised Hermanos Rodríguez circuit.

Pre-race
On 20 February 1992 Mexico city officials put out a smog alert due to the dangerous air pollution levels in the city. Alerts mandated restrictions on operating heavy motorized equipment. The Mexican Grand Prix committee had to delay work paving sections of the track.

The planned pre-qualifying session was again cancelled, as it had been in South Africa, where the Andrea Moda team was excluded from the event due to non-payment of the $100,000 guarantee required for new teams. With the guarantee now paid, FISA clarified that if Andrea Moda came to Mexico with two new cars that met the regulations, the team would be reinstated in the Championship. Therefore team owner Andrea Sassetti abandoned the C4B car with its Coloni origins, and brought forward the introduction of their new car, the Simtek-designed Andrea Moda S921, which was originally intended for the fourth round in Spain. The team brought two hastily-built S921s for Alex Caffi and Enrico Bertaggia, but the cars could not be made ready in time for pre-qualifying. So Sassetti withdrew his cars, citing "freight delays" as extenuating circumstances. With only four cars remaining in the pre-qualifying pool, the session was cancelled.

Qualifying

Qualifying report
During Friday's practice Ayrton Senna hit one of the bumps in the Esses, crashed his McLaren, and injured his leg, but was fit for qualifying.

This was the first time that neither Brabham made the grid. Stefano Modena had to start from the pit lane. Nigel Mansell was obliged to switch to the spare Williams FW14B car for qualifying but this did not faze him and he made pole alongside teammate Riccardo Patrese.

Qualifying classification

Race

Race report
Nigel Mansell dominated the race straight from the pole position, finishing the race 12 seconds ahead of Patrese and 21 seconds ahead of Michael Schumacher.  Senna's transmission broke on the 11th lap, ending his race prematurely; teammate Berger finished 4th, salvaging some pride for McLaren in the farewell race for the MP4/6. Gerhard Berger managed to get ahead of Martin Brundle with a battle that managed to last for eight laps until Brundle was able to move back up to fourth on lap 44 but soon retired with engine trouble on lap 47, ending the battle for fourth. At the front, Mansell won with Patrese making it a Williams 1–2 again ahead of Schumacher, Berger, de Cesaris and Mika Häkkinen scoring the final point for Lotus for the second race in succession from South Africa and respectively the Finn's first point of the season.

Race classification

Championship standings after the race

Drivers' Championship standings

Constructors' Championship standings

References

Mexican Grand Prix
Mexican Grand Prix
Grand Prix
March 1992 sports events in Mexico